The Pancake Parlour is an Australian family-owned pancake restaurant chain, serving sweet and savoury pancakes and crepes with locations in Victoria.

The first Pancake Parlour restaurant opened in Gilbert Place, Adelaide, on 15 May 1965 as "The Pancake Kitchen" and is still is in operation today as "The Original Pancake Kitchen". The first restaurant was established by Roger Meadmore and Allen and Helen Trachsel. The Trachsels and their children Samantha Jewel (Meadmore) and Simon Meadmore moved to Melbourne opening "The Pancake Parlour" in Market Lane in 1969. Samantha left the company in 2009, whilst Simon is now the sole owner. Meadmore moved to Sydney and on 17 August 1975 opened "Pancakes on the Rocks". There are twelve Melbourne restaurants, with the Doncaster, Highpoint, Fountain Gate and Malvern East restaurants open 24 hours a day.

The Pancake Parlour also serves fish, chicken, salads and savoury crepes as well as a variety of breakfast dishes. The Pancake Parlour also sells its pancake mix and pancake syrup in supermarkets across Australia.

See also
 List of pancake houses

References

External links

Fast-food chains of Australia
Restaurants in Victoria (Australia)
Pancake houses
1965 establishments in Australia
Restaurants established in 1965